Masjid-o-Anwari is a mosque in the neighbourhood of Triplicane in Chennai, India. It was constructed by Anwaruddin Muhammed Khan, Nawab of the Carnatic in the 18th century. Located in Big Street, the mosque was used as a congregational mosque until 1847.

References 

 

o-Anwari